"The Waiting" is the lead single from Tom Petty and the Heartbreakers' album Hard Promises released in 1981. The song peaked at #19 on the Billboard Hot 100 singles chart and #1 on the magazine's new Rock Tracks chart, where it remained for six consecutive weeks during the summer of 1981.

Background
Frontman Tom Petty explained that the song's title was inspired by a quote from fellow musician Janis Joplin, who once said of touring, "I love being onstage and everything else is just waiting." He recalled:

Reception
Record World praised Petty's vocal performance and said that "Those guitars ring, soar & jingle-jangle with enough rock n' roll passion to warm the most jaded heart."

Covers 
Linda Ronstadt covered the song on her 1995 album Feels Like Home.
 Natalie Imbruglia covered the song on her album Male released in 2015.
Country artist Jon Pardi covered the song on his album Rancho Fiesta Sessions in 2020.

In popular culture 
The song was used in The Simpsons episode "The Cartridge Family", during a sequence where Homer was subjected to a five-day waiting period after buying a gun.

"The Waiting" was used in a promotional spot for the fifth season of the hit television comedy series, The Office.

The song is played at Philadelphia Flyers and Wisconsin Badgers home games, when a goal or other play is under review by officials.

Petty performed the song on It's Garry Shandling's Show in 1987.

The song was used on Chicago television news in 1995, as the public awaited news of Michael Jordan's return to the NBA.

Comedian Steve Goodie wrote and recorded a parody of the song titled "Ned Beatty Had the Hardest Part," which became a staple on radio morning shows, like The Bob & Tom Show, in the mid-1990s.

When the Houston Astros won the 2017 World Series, the song was played on FOX after the trophy presentation.

Personnel
Tom Petty – rhythm guitar, lead vocals
Mike Campbell – lead guitar, bass guitar
Benmont Tench – keyboards, backing vocals
Stan Lynch – drums, backing vocals
Phil Jones – percussion

Charts

See also
List of Billboard Mainstream Rock number-one songs of the 1980s

References

External links
Behind the Waiting - Extract from the documentary Runnin' Down a Dream

Tom Petty songs
1981 singles
1981 songs
Songs written by Tom Petty
Song recordings produced by Jimmy Iovine
Jangle pop songs